Palansuriya Mohottalalage Dingiri Mahaththaya (known as Sagara Palansuriya in later life, was a Sri Lankan poet, teacher and Member of Parliament.

Early life
Palansuriya Mohottalalage Dingiri Mahaththaya was born on 11 March 1908 at Kalalella, Ratnapura, Sri Lanka.

Sagara undertook his primary education at Madampagama Rural Sinhala school, going on, to then join the Sangha under the name Ven. Kalalelle Pemananda. Under the tutelage of Ven. Ethoya Penanissa thero he was educated in the Sinhalese language, literature, sociology, culture and politics, in addition to learning several eastern languages as a scholar of the Vidyalankara Pirivena (now the University of Kelaniya). He traveled to Shanthi Nikethana in India to continue his studies.

Career and service
In his second term of priestliness, Kalalelle Ananda Sagara continued his career as a teacher and promoted his style of Poesy, compiling verses such as Kalakanniya, Kelani Withthi, Paddiyavatiya, Mal Hamy and Visirinu Tharu under the pseudonym KAS (Kayes). His best works are regarded to have been Sudo Sudu and the KAS Markup Script, both of which contributed to his recognition as one among the leading literary figures in the country.

He also was a teacher at Ananda College Colombo and Nalanda College, Colombo.

Palansuriya went on to renounce his monkhood, reverting to his lay name Sagara Palansuriya, and entered politics in 1947, joining the 
Viplavakari Lanka Sama Samaja Party led by Philip Gunawardena. He was able to secure a place in Parliament in 1956, representing the Horana Electoral District for the Mahajana Ekasth Peramuna led by S. W. R. D. Bandaranaike. Due to his interest in left-wing politics, he maintained a close relationship with Sama Samaja and Communist Party politicians, including Tikiri Banda Subasinghe, K. M. P. Rajarathna, Nimal Karunatillake, Lakshman Rajapaksa, M. S. Themis and T. B. Ilangaratne. He often drew attention to the plight of the rural farming community.

Palansuriya retired from politics in 1960 due to failing health and died on 22 June 1961.

See also
Wimalaratne Kumaragama

References

1908 births
1961 deaths
Sri Lankan poets
Sinhalese politicians
Members of the 3rd Parliament of Ceylon
20th-century poets
Faculty of Nalanda College, Colombo